Chironomus tentans is a species in the family Chironomidae ("midges"), in the order Diptera ("flies"). Like several other species of Chironomidae, C. tentans can be cultivated in laboratories, where their quick lifecycle is a benefit. Their larvae make good candidates for toxicity tests.

References

Further reading 

 Benoit, D.A., Sibley, P.K., Juenemann, J.L. and Ankley, G.T. (1997), Chironomus tentans life-cycle test: Design and evaluation for use in assessing toxicity of contaminated sediments. Environmental Toxicology and Chemistry, 16: 1165-1176. 
 Martinez, E. A., et al. “Morphologic and Growth Responses in Chironomus Tentans to Arsenic Exposure.” Archives of Environmental Contamination and Toxicology, vol. 51, no. 4, Nov. 2006, pp. 529–36. EBSCOhost.
 Savić-Zdravković, Dimitrija, et al. “An Environmentally Relevant Concentration of Titanium Dioxide (TiO 2 ) Nanoparticles Induces Morphological Changes in the Mouthparts of Chironomus Tentans.” Chemosphere, vol. 211, Nov. 2018, pp. 489–99. EBSCOhost.
 Tang, Guanghui, et al. “Comparison of Gene Expression Profiles in the Aquatic Midge (Chironomus Tentans) Larvae Exposed to Two Major Agricultural Pesticides.” Chemosphere, vol. 194, Mar. 2018, pp. 745–54. EBSCOhost.

External links 
 

Chironomidae